Misa Willk'i (Aymara misa offering, willk'i gap, also spelled Mesavilque) is a  mountain in the Andes of Bolivia. It is located in the La Paz Department, José Manuel Pando Province, at the border of the Catacora Municipality and the Santiago de Machaca Municipality. Misa Willk'i lies northeast of Sinijawi and southeast of Wari Kunka.

References 

Mountains of La Paz Department (Bolivia)